Radio Student (100.69 FM) is the first student radio station in Croatia, broadcasting since 1996 in Zagreb. The station is non-profit, non-commercial serving as an educational radio for students of Zagreb University. It is located at the Faculty of Political Sciences, which is licensed to broadcast to a part of the city of Zagreb.

Programming 
Program is focused on students, student issues, education and creativity as well as new trends and modern lifestyles as appropriate to Radio Student's target audience. News are edited by the students of journalism themselves. Talk shows and magazines include topics on education, culture, art, science, ecology, society, politics, etc. Music is very varied, covering various genres and interests with specialized One Man shows in the afternoons and evenings. The show's annual birthday is celebrated each year by a club event.

Web streaming 
Radio Student offers a wide range of on-line streaming possibilities. Available streams include Windows Media Video (camera from the main control room), Windows Media Audio, RealVideo, RealAudio as well as full spectrum of AAC and aacPlus streams, currently the highest quality audio streaming technology. Streams are provided in cooperation with CARNET (Croatian Academic and Research Network).

Mobile streaming 
Radio Student is also the first station in Croatia that can be listened on mobile phones.

See also 
List of radio stations in Croatia

References

External links 
Radio Student official web page
Radio Student web and mobile streaming page
CARNET - Croatian Academic and Research Network
University Of Zagreb
Faculty of Political Sciences

Radio stations in Croatia
Campus, college, student and university radio stations
Mass media in Zagreb
1996 establishments in Croatia
Radio stations established in 1996